Lisa and Lottie (original German title: Das doppelte Lottchen, "The Double Lottie") (published since 2014 in the United Kingdom and Australia as The Parent Trap) is a 1949 German novel by Erich Kästner, about twin girls separated in infancy who meet at summer camp.
The book originally started out during World War II as an aborted movie scenario. In 1942, when for a brief time Kästner was allowed by the Nazi authorities to work as a screenwriter, he proposed it to Josef von Báky, under the title The Great Secret, but the Nazis once again forbade him to work.
After the war, Kästner worked the idea into the highly successful book. Subsequently, it has been adapted into film many times, most notably 
Disney's 1961 film The Parent Trap starring Hayley Mills, the subsequent film series, and their various translations.

Plot summary 
Two nine-year-old girls, bold Lisa Palfy (orig. Luise Palfy) from Vienna and shy Lottie Horn (orig. Lotte Körner) from Munich meet in a summer camp in Bohrlaken on Lake Bohren (orig. 'Seebühl am Bühlsee'), where they discover that they are identical twins whose parents divorced, each keeping one of the girls.
The girls decide to swap places at the end of the summer so that Lottie will have a chance to get to know her father and Lisa will get to meet her mother. While many adults are surprised at the changes in each of the girls after they return from camp ("Lottie" has apparently forgotten how to cook, gets in a fight at school, and becomes a terrible student, while "Lisa" has begun to keep a close eye on the housekeeper's bookkeeping, will no longer eat her favorite food, and becomes a model student), no one suspects that the girls are not who they claim to be.
When Lottie (under the name of Lisa) finds that her father is planning to remarry, she becomes very ill and stops writing to her sister in Munich. Meanwhile, Lottie's mother comes across a picture of the two girls at summer camp, and Lisa tells her the entire story. The girls' mother calls her former husband in Vienna to tell him what has happened and to find out why Lottie has stopped writing. When she hears that her daughter is ill, she and Lisa immediately travel to Vienna. At the daughters' request, the parents are reunited.

Differences between American and British translations
In 2014, the novel was translated by Anthea Bell and published in the United Kingdom and Australia by Pushkin Press as The Parent Trap, after the successful Disney films, replacing the previous translation by Cyrus Brooks which is still published in the United States and Canada. Bell's translation is more faithful to the German original in line with the publisher's aim of introducing children to stories from different languages and cultures.
In Bell's translation, the twins are named as Luise Palfy and Lottie Körner, explaining the use of a different title, and are stated to be named after their mother Luiselotte. In the same translation, the location of the summer camp is named as Seebühl on Lake Bühl.

Films
 1950: Das doppelte Lottchen (Germany), screenplay and narrator Erich Kästner
 1961: The Parent Trap with Hayley Mills (United States)
 1968: Do Kaliyaan (India)
 1994: Charlie & Louise (Germany)
 1998: The Parent Trap with Lindsay Lohan (United States)
 2001: ''Kuch Khatti Kuch Meethi (India)

References

English editions 

1949 German novels
Novels by Erich Kästner
German children's novels
Twins in fiction
German novels adapted into films
Love stories
1949 children's books
German novels adapted into television shows